Pougnet is a French surname. Notable people with the surname include: 

Jean Pougnet (1907–1968), Mauritian-born British violinist and orchestra leader
Steve Pougnet (born 1963), American businessman and politician

French-language surnames